Melicope christophersenii is a species of plant in the family Rutaceae known by the common name Waianae Range melicope. It is endemic to the Hawaiian Islands.  It is threatened by habitat loss. It was named in honour of Erling Christophersen.

References

christophersenii
Endemic flora of Hawaii
Biota of Oahu
Waianae Range
Taxonomy articles created by Polbot